Monroe Township is one of the eighteen townships of Richland County, Ohio, United States.  It is a part of the Mansfield Metropolitan Statistical Area.  The 2020 census found 2,731 people in the township.

Geography
Located in the southeastern part of the county, it borders the following townships:
Mifflin Township – north, west of Mifflin Township, Ashland County
Mifflin Township, Ashland County – north, east of Mifflin Township, Richland County
Vermillion Township, Ashland County – northeast corner
Green Township, Ashland County – east
Hanover Township, Ashland County – southeast corner
Butler Township – south
Jefferson Township – southwest corner
Washington Township – west
Madison Township – northwest corner

Part of the village of Lucas is located in northwestern Monroe Township.

Name and history
It is one of twenty-two Monroe Townships statewide.

Government
The township is governed by a three-member board of trustees, who are elected in November of odd-numbered years to a four-year term beginning on the following January 1. Two are elected in the year after the presidential election and one is elected in the year before it. There is also an elected township fiscal officer, who serves a four-year term beginning on April 1 of the year after the election, which is held in November of the year before the presidential election. Vacancies in the fiscal officership or on the board of trustees are filled by the remaining trustees.

References

External links
Township website
County website

Townships in Richland County, Ohio
Townships in Ohio